Raymundo Faoro (27 April 1925, in Vacaria – 15 May 2003, in Rio de Janeiro) was a lawyer, jurist, sociologist, historian, writer and president of the Brazilian Bar Association, which in Portuguese is known as OAB (Ordem dos Advogados do Brasil). Even though lawyers have an extensive presence in the political arena of Brazil, not one president after Faoro gained the same intellectual respect as he did.

Faoro was the author of several books. The most important of all these books was "Os Donos do Poder" (The Owners of Power). In this book, Faoro describes the history of power in Brazilian history, from the pre-colonial times to approximately the end of Getúlio Vargas's first term.

In this book, Faoro gave special attention to the "estamento", or Stand, which he notes was a classification used by Marx but mistranslated in the English and French translations of his German work. This "Stand", which he differentiates clearly from the ruling "Elite" was dominant in the creation of modern Brazil.
 
According to Faoro, this "Stand", a strange mixture of the nobility, the bureaucrats and the military, always attempted to use the power and wealth of the State in self benefit, so preventing the masses from ruling the country in benefit of the majority. He also wrote books on Brazilian social and political thought, on the writer and poet Machado de Assis and Brazilian modern society and politics.

Faoro's book became one of the reference points for the understanding of Brazilian society and influenced Brazilian and Brazilianist sociology, historiography and political science. Other books which gained such recognition were Sergio Buarque de Holanda's Raizes do Brasil, Gilberto Freyre's Casa Grande e Senzala and Caio Prado Junior's Formação do Brasil Contemporâneo.

References

 Molossi, Luis – Raymundo Faoro: un bellunese che ha conosciuto "quelli di potere" in Brasile In: Revista Insieme, March 2013, nº 171. Curitiba.

1925 births
2003 deaths
20th-century Brazilian lawyers
Brazilian sociologists
20th-century Brazilian historians
Brazilian people of Italian descent
20th-century Brazilian male writers
People from Vacaria